WHTK (1280 kHz) is an AM radio station broadcasting a sports format. Licensed to Rochester, New York, United States, the station serves the Rochester area.  The station is owned by iHeartMedia. The studios are located at the Five Star Bank Plaza building in downtown Rochester while its transmitter located in Brighton. It features programming from Fox Sports Radio. WHTK carries New York Yankees broadcasts, shares rights to the Rochester Red Wings with WYSL (with WYSL carrying afternoon games and WHTK carrying night games), among other local and national sports.  The station's weekday lineup includes The Dan Patrick Show, The Herd with Colin Cowherd, and The Doug Gottlieb Show. On weekends, the station carries a variety of sports programming including the Canandaigua National Bank High School Sports Show (section V athletics), The Pain Clinic (pro wrestling), Kick This! (soccer), What's Going On (current events and issues) and more.

History

In 2008, the station re-branded itself as "Sportsradio 1280". Prior to the change, WHTK had been known as "Hot Talk 1280". As of 2014, the station is now known as "FOX Sports 1280 Rochester".

Prior to that, the station was first known as WVET, signing on in 1947, under ownership of a group of returning World War II veterans calling themselves Veterans' Broadcasting Company. It operated successfully for many years with a personality full service adult popular music format. It changed call sign from WVET to WROC when Veterans bought WROC-TV from Transcontinent Television Corporation in 1961. Simultaneously, an FM sister station, WROC-FM, signed on, first playing classical music and later automated jazz and pop standards. Veterans sold the WROC radio stations in 1964 to Rust Craft Broadcasting, who would then sell the stations to Associated Broadcasters (which later became Pyramid Broadcasting) in 1979. The AM station continued with its full service format until late in the 1970s, when it tried an all-news format first as WROC and then as WPXN. It would later change calls letters to WPXY and aired the satellite-fed "Music of Your Life" adult standards format before dropping that in January 1984 for a simulcast with its FM sister station, by the early 1980s known as WPXY-FM and airing the contemporary hit music format, which WPXY-FM still runs today. In 1990, the AM split from the simulcast and returned to Music of Your Life. In 1991, WPXY (AM) changed to oldies as WKQG, then back to a simulcast with the FM (again as WPXY), and then, on November 1, 1993, after The Lincoln Group began to operate the station from Pyramid (who kept the FM), flipped to mostly syndicated "hot talk", a lineup of talk and sports programming meant to appeal to young adult men. At that time, it adopted the WHTK call sign (the "HTK" meant to stand for "hot talk") which it still uses today. Over the next few years, the station would add more sports-oriented programming. In 1996, WHTK would be split from WPXY-FM permanently when the station was sold to Jacor (after several subsequent mergers, Clear Channel Communications (now iHeartMedia) would acquire the station in 2000).

On September 9, 2009, at midnight, WROO changed callsigns to WHTK-FM and changed their format from country music, as "Country 107.3" to sports, simulcasting WHTK 1280 AM, as "1280 WHTK & FM 107.3", and is known as "Rochester's Sports Talk." The change was made to address nighttime signal limitations of WHTK (AM), which must protect co-channel signals in New York City and the midwestern US by directionalizing after sunset. The FM station filled in signal nulls which limited WHTK's nighttime and early morning reach in southeastern Monroe County, southern Wayne County and Ontario County. The FM simulcast ended on May 5, 2012.

WHTK was the longtime radio home of the Rochester Americans of the American Hockey League. The Americans jumped to WROC in 2016 as a result of a five-year deal between Pegula Sports and Entertainment (the Americans' owners) and Entercom.

References

External links
FCC History Cards for WHTK

HTK
IHeartMedia radio stations
Fox Sports Radio stations
Radio stations established in 1947
1947 establishments in New York (state)